Joerstadia is a genus of rust fungi in the family Phragmidiaceae. The genus contains four species known from Africa, including Madagascar, which grow on Alchemilla plants.

References

External links

Pucciniales